Wargrave is a historic village and civil parish in Berkshire, England. The village is primarily on the River Thames but also along the confluence of the River Loddon and lies on the border with southern Oxfordshire. The village has many old listed buildings, two marinas with chandlery services for boats, a boating club and rises steeply to the northeast in the direction of Bowsey Hill, with higher parts of the village generally known as Upper Wargrave. In Upper Wargrave is a Recreation Ground with a cricket club, bowls club, football pitch and tennis club.

The  village is larger than the county average, having a railway station on the Henley Branch Line, off the Great Western Main Line from London Paddington; the village is quickly accessible to nearby parts of the M4 corridor, particularly Berkshire and Heathrow Airport and local major centres of employment include Reading and Maidenhead, with smaller businesses and additional commercial facilities in nearby Henley-on-Thames and Wokingham.

History

Original forms of name
It is in the Borough of Wokingham. The name Wargrave is derived from 'Weir-Grove', as it was in the Assize Rolls and Patent rolls of the medieval times recorded as 'Weregreave', settling on a slightly different pronunciation after the Great Vowel Shift rendering it Wargrave.

Early history

The first documentary evidence of the settlement was recorded in 1061 which indicates that it was a village and had a manor in the feudal system. The Domesday Book of 1086 records the settlement as having a population of 250. In the 13th century the current High Street was lined with plots and backstreets developed. Wargrave Court was erected in the early Tudor period and then altered and extended in the Georgian to post-Edwardian period. Wargrave Manor occupies its medieval site on the northern outskirts, bounded by its lower meadow that overlooks Wargrave Marsh below it, which is drained farmland downstream and the local primary floodplain.  However this building, while also grade II listed, is larger, with a modest landscaped park. It is late Georgian and altered later in a painted stucco with moulded, chamfered quoins, moulding over second floor windows, hipped slate roof with several chimneys, spread over three storeys save for the wings.  

The east front has a conical roof over a protrusion of a similar shape with three sash windows flanked by a single bays with similar windows: all windows have architrave surrounds, with the ground floor windows having Victorian panes. This section has a Doric veranda with coupled columns supporting entablature across the whole front. Flanking wings have two upper sash windows and venetian windows on their ground floor.  Its Victorian south front has 5 bays repeating the design and a central porch of angle pilasters supporting entablature and blocking course.  Above the double door is a radiating fanlight. The west front has a large Victorian semi-circular terrace in front. The village continued to develop into its current form in the 18th century growing up the hill from the High Street eastwards so that by the end of the 19th century this axis, now Victoria Road, was fully settled.

Post Industrial Revolution
In the 20th century the village's population grew significantly, especially in the 1970s and 1980s as new developments on farmland inside the parish boundaries responded to demand for housing for commuters working in and on the increasingly commercial western outskirts of London. Wargrave War Memorial was commissioned in the aftermath of the First World War. Taking the shape of a hexagonal cross on the village green, it was designed by Sir Edwin Lutyens and unveiled on 28 May 1922. It is a grade II listed building.

Geography
The village encloses in its west the confluence of the River Loddon and the River Thames. It is on the A321 north–south road between Twyford and Henley-on-Thames. On the opposite bank of the River Thames are the villages of Shiplake and Lower Shiplake.  When taken as its civil parish, such as in all of its history and in civil parish council provision of footpath maintenance and annual village events, it includes Hare Hatch and Cockpole Green.  These largest hamlets rely on Wargrave's businesses (such as post office, shops, hairdressing and other usual large village services) and for education.

The railway operator provides trains at least every 30 minutes each way on Monday-Friday and allows connections to Reading and London Paddington. If a change of train is made at Twyford, the time to the capital is 53–70 minutes. A large proportion of the residents in employment commute to outlying areas, as the village itself supports a small range of shops and businesses, but the average commute is more than five miles to support the local economy as at the 2011 census.

Christian buildings and memorials
The Church of England parish church of Saint Mary dates from the 12th century and has the wide ecclesiastical parish of Wargrave with Knowl Hill. It is situated on Mill Green, off the High Street. In 1914 it was set on fire and gutted as a result of a mistakenly targeted direct action by the Suffragette Movement.  The north door remains from the 12th century, the tower from 1635 and the remaining structure was built following the fire. This is a Grade II* listed building.

In the gardens of the churchyard is the Hannen Columbarium, a columbarium built to house the remains of the Hannen family. It was designed by Edwin Lutyens and is considered an interesting example of his early work. The ashes of Sir Nicholas John Hannen, judge, his son, Nicholas "Beau" Hannen, actor, and Beau's wife Athene Seyler, also an actor, are all interred in the columbarium. Thomas Day (1748–1789), author and abolitionist, is also buried in the churchyard, after being fatally thrown from his horse. The Roman Catholic church of Our Lady of Peace was built in 1963 and is supported by the Parish of Saint Thomas More of the neighbouring village, Twyford.

The river

There are marinas and Wargrave Boating Club for those who use the River Thames for leisure and sport. In August, the Wargrave & Shiplake Regatta is held over two days on the Shiplake riverbank opposite. The regatta combines serious and light-hearted racing in canoes, dinghies, dongolas and skiffs. It is the largest community event of the year having taken place since 1867. The event ends with a large firework display on the Saturday night. Wargrave is mentioned in Jerome K. Jerome's, 1889 book Three Men in a Boat, a humorous account of a boating holiday on the River Thames:

Amenities
At one time there were seven public houses on High Street, serving the stage coaches travelling between Henley-on-Thames and Reading; there are now only three. The pubs remaining today are the Bull, the Greyhound and the St George and Dragon. The Queen Victoria public house in Hare Hatch recently closed and is being redeveloped into housing. Wargrave has its own primary school, which is split into the infant school and junior school, and a secondary academy school – The Piggott School formerly a comprehensive school, now an academy. Each is a Church of England voluntary controlled school and are also feeder schools to each other. They are all named after Robert Piggott.

Demography
Wargrave is recorded since at least the Norman Conquest as covering the land right up to the crest of the hills to the east, (but only in terms of the civil parish since the building of chapels of ease in the outlying parts after the 19th century secular/religious split).  At the level of local government above this, the  Wargrave ward is redrawn typically every 12 years to roughly even out the population between such wards.  It covers a similar area.  As is common across the United Kingdom],the RG10 postcode of the mid-county-covering Reading post town is for postal convenience and bears a slight relation to the largest administrative border as currently drawn. Key statistics from both administrative areas are shown in the table below together with the nucleus of Wargrave twin census Lower Level Super Output Areas which omits a few communities of Wargrave which are isolated by buffering fields and woodlands.

Notable residents
 Richard Aldworth (c.1614–1680), MP for Reading, was born in Wargrave
 Dave Allen, comedian
 Angela Baddeley, actress, lived in Wargrave prior to her death in 1976
 Richard Barry, 7th Earl of Barrymore
 Raymond Baxter, television presenter
 Bert Bushnell, athlete 1948 Olympic Gold medalist at double sculls
 Paul Daniels and Debbie McGee, magician and his wife/assistant
 Peter Davison, actor, lived in Willow Lane, Wargrave in the 1980s
 Sandra Dickinson, actress
 Nicholas "Beau" Hannen, actor (son of Sir Nicholas Hannen)
 Sir Nicholas John Hannen, Chief Justice of the British Supreme Court for China and Japan
 Mary Hopkin, singer
 Sir Morell Mackenzie, physician and surgeon
 Robert Morley, actor
 Bobby Whitlock, Musician, Derek and the Dominoes, Delaney and Bonnie, Eric Clapton, also featured on All Things Must Pass (George Harrison)

Nearest places

Notes

References

Sources

 Gray, R. and Griffiths, S. (eds) (1986), The Book of Wargrave, Wargrave: Wargrave Local History Society,

External links

 Wargrave News Online
 Wargrave Parish Council
 Berkshire History: Wargrave
 Wargrave Cricket Club

Civil parishes in Berkshire
Populated places on the River Thames
Villages in Berkshire
Borough of Wokingham